Gadhali is a village in Jalgaon district of Maharashtra, India. It is located in the Amalner taluka, 9 km north-east of the Amalner town. It is the first place in Khandesh at which Gujarat Shravak Vanis settled.  In 1804 it was plundered and its people scattered by a Pindari leader named Ghodji Bhonsle.

History 

Gandhali Amalner and has Tapi River flowing in northern side at a distance of 7km and has agriculture and farming as main lines of activity. It also has ancient times Jain temple and had wide presence of Gujrathi and Marwadi community during earlier days. History reveals King Shivaji having commuted to Surat via Burhanpur, Dharangaon and Gandhali. It has 300 meters height stoned base along with 7 stoned gates and 14 combating internal gateways.

Transport 
You can travel to Gandhali via State Transport bus from Amalaner named Amalaner to Jalod. Or one can go by minidoor, riksha stand outside ST stand.

Culture 

Near about in Diwali Gadhali village has Fair(yatra) of its own village of Kakasatmaharaj Mandhir.

Village has ancient time two Mahadev temples and two Maruti temples along with grand Vitthal - Rukhmai temple and has Kakasat Maharaj festivity as annual event. It also having Saptashrungi Devi Mandir nearly 3 km on Amalner road. Also Datta temple( Udaykal-1356).

Notable people 

 Ex-MP and MLA Bhausaheb K. M. Patil, the first president of Jalgaon Zilla Parishad (1962)
 Nirhatta Datta Pantha founder Madhva-Muni

Infrastructure 

Varkari education trust Chairman Vitthabuva Chaudhari has completed his primary education here. Village has primary and secondary schools and JDCC Bank branch.

Villages in Jalgaon district